Andrei Ivanovich Veselovsky (birth: 28 July 1951, Lviv) is a Ukrainian diplomat. Ambassador Extraordinary and Plenipotentiary of Ukraine. Permanent Representative of Ukraine to the European Union in 2008–2010.

Education 
Andrei Veselovsky graduated from Institute of International relations of Taras Shevchenko National University of Kyiv in 1974. Fluent in French and English.

Career 
From 1974 to 1975 - he was a senior laboratory preparatory department of Kyiv Institute of Civil Engineering.

From 1975 to 1977 - he worked as an editor, senior editor, columnist graduating edition for advanced wireless telegraphy Ukrainian foreign newspaper agency in Ukraine (RATAU).

Since 1978 - Member of the Union of Journalists of Ukraine.

From 1977 to 1983 - Editor, Senior Editor of Press and Information Society of the Ukrainian cultural ties abroad.

From 1983 to 1986 - he was a translator of French in Algeria.

From 1986 to 1992 - he worked as a 2nd secretary, 1st secretary, counselor of Information Ministry of Foreign Affairs of Ukraine.

From 1992 to 1996 - Counselor of the Embassy of Ukraine in Canada.

Since 07.1996 - Deputy Head of Policy Analysis and Planning

Since 08.1997 - Acting Head of Policy Analysis and Planning

From 01.1998 to 01.2001 - he was Head of Policy Analysis and Planning, member of the board of the Ministry of Foreign Affairs of Ukraine.

From 01.2001 to 05.08.2005 - Ambassador Extraordinary and Plenipotentiary of Ukraine to the Arab Republic of Egypt.

From 03.2002 to 10.2003 - Ambassador Extraordinary and Plenipotentiary of Ukraine to the Republic of Kenya in combination.

From 04.2002 to 05.08.2005 - Ambassador Extraordinary and Plenipotentiary of Ukraine to the Republic of Sudan in combination.

27 December 2005 - 19.03.2008 - Deputy Minister of Foreign Affairs of Ukraine.

From 17.03.2008 to 12.05.2010 - Permanent Representative of Ukraine to the European Union.

References

External links
 Mission of Ukraine to the European Union
 EU-Ukraine start negotiations on new Enhanced Agreement
 BLACK SEA SYNERGY
 YES is an international network established to promote the development of a just, free and prosperous Ukraine, to open the country to the rest of the world and to support Ukraine’s membership to the European Union.

Living people
1951 births
Ukrainian politicians
Ukrainian journalists
Ambassadors of Ukraine to the European Union
Ambassadors of Ukraine to Egypt
Taras Shevchenko National University of Kyiv alumni